Jack Showell (7 February 1915 – 13 December 1989) was an Australian rules footballer who played with St Kilda Football Club in the Victorian Football League (VFL).

References

External links 

1915 births
1989 deaths
Australian rules footballers from Victoria (Australia)
St Kilda Football Club players
Castlemaine Football Club players